Pleurotomella deliciosa is a species of sea snail, a marine gastropod mollusk in the family Raphitomidae.

Description
The length of the shell attains 4 mm.

Distribution
This marine species occurs in the Davis Sea and the Weddell Sea, Antarctica.

References

External links
 Die antarktischen Schnecken und Muscheln, In: Deutsche Südpolar-Expedition 1901-1903 (Erich von Drygalski, E.v. ed.), vol. 8, No. 5, Georg Reimer, Berlin.
 Kantor Y.I., Harasewych M.G. & Puillandre N. (2016). A critical review of Antarctic Conoidea (Neogastropoda). Molluscan Research. 36(3): 153-206
 
  Griffiths, H.J.; Linse, K.; Crame, J.A. (2003). SOMBASE - Southern Ocean mollusc database: a tool for biogeographic analysis in diversity and evolution. Organisms Diversity and Evolution. 3: 207-213

deliciosa
Gastropods described in 1912